Li Chun (born January 11, 1988), known professionally as Li Qinyao, is a Chinese actress and former singer. From 2007 to 2010, she was a member of the Japanese girl group Morning Musume under the stage name .

As an actress, Li has appeared in television and film projects including Moon Embracing the Stars and Eastern Battlefield.

Career

2007-2010: Morning Musume
In 2006, Li auditioned for Super Girl, but failed to enter the top 10. Tsunku, who planned on expanding Hello! Project into overseas Asian markets, offered her and the other eliminated Super Girl contestants an opportunity to enter an audition for Morning Musume in Beijing, China, which was kept secret from the members of Morning Musume themselves. Li accepted in spite of her family's disapproval due to the Japanese-Chinese tensions.

On March 15, 2007, Li was officially announced as an eighth generation member in Morning Musume as a "foreign exchange student" along with Lin Lin. On March 18, 2007, she made her first Japanese television appearance on Hello! Morning, Morning Musume's variety show. Within the same week, she moved to Tokyo, Japan. Li made her first stage appearance took place during Morning Musume leader Hitomi Yoshizawa's graduation concert on May 6, 2007 at Saitama Super Arena. In July 2007, Morning Musume released the single "Onna ni Sachi Are", Li's first song with the group.

In 2009, Li, along with Morning Musume members Sayumi Michishige and Koharu Kusumi and Berryz Kobo member Risako Sugaya, released the song "Sekai wa Futari no Tame ni" as the group Zoku V-U-Den.

During the final show of Hello! Project's 2010 summer tour on August 8, 2010, Li, along with Lin Lin and Eri Kamei, announced they would be leaving Morning Musume after the final show of their fall tour, Morning Musume 2010 Rival Survival. Her final single with the group was "Onna to Otoko no Lullaby Game", which was released on November 17, 2010. Li's final performance with the group took place on December 15, 2010, during which she sang "Furusato" as her graduation song.

2011-present: Return to China

In late August 2011, she was announced to be cast in a Chinese school-life film "Love for a Second" and as of early September 2011, she was discovered to be enrolling in the famous Beijing Film Academy, studying Performance Arts.

On May 8, 2015, Li announced through her Weibo account that she would be changing her professional name into "Li Qinyao."

Personal life

On December 26, 2014, Li announced on Weibo that she had married Chinese music producer Bernard Zheng.

Discography

Filmography

Television

Film

References

External links 

 Official blog 

1988 births
Living people
Japanese female idols
Morning Musume members
21st-century Chinese actresses
Chinese expatriates in Japan
V-u-den members
Super Girl contestants
People from Yueyang
Japanese-language singers
Musicians from Hunan